August Luik (22 January 1899 Pajusi Parish (now Põltsamaa Parish), Kreis Fellin – 1930 Soviet Union) was an Estonian politician. He was a member of the III Riigikogu, representing the Estonian Workers' Party. He was a member of the Riigikogu since 21 June 1926. He replaced Rosalie Verner. On 7 May 1928, he resigned his position and he was replaced by Konstantin Veiss.

References

1899 births
1930 deaths
People from Põltsamaa Parish
People from Kreis Fellin
Estonian Workers' Party politicians
Members of the Riigikogu, 1926–1929
Estonian emigrants to the Soviet Union